Alexander Ferris (born April 23, 1997) is a Canadian actor. He is best known for playing Billy Gornicke in the road film RV (2006), Victor Newton in the thriller film The Invisible (2007), Young Henry DeTamble in the drama film The Time Traveler's Wife (2009), and Collin Lee in the comedy film Diary of a Wimpy Kid (2010). Ferris is also the voice of Charlie Brown in Peanuts Motion Comics from 2008 to 2010, T.D. Kennelly in the PBS Kids animated TV series Martha Speaks and Paulie the Pliosaurus in the PBS Kids computer-animated TV series Dinosaur Train.

Early life
Ferris was born in Vancouver, British Columbia. He began acting at the age of seven after meeting another child actor on a family vacation, and writing to the actor's agent.

Career 
He appeared in the movie RV as Billy Gornicke, The Invisible as Victor Newton, Diary of a Wimpy Kid as Collin Lee and The Time Traveler's Wife as Young Henry DeTamble. He played in the Showtime Network's The L Word as Wilson Mann-Peabody, son of Helena.  He also played Young Sam Winchester in the TV series Supernatural, episode "Something Wicked". In 2009, he appeared in an episode of Smallville entitled "Eternal" as a young Davis Bloome.

Ferris was the voice of T.D. Kennelly in the first four seasons of the television series Martha Speaks, Paulie the Pliosaurus in Dinosaur Train, Dreamfish in the Barbie animated movie Barbie in A Mermaid Tale, and Charlie Brown in Peanuts Motion Comics in 2008.

In 2016, he starred as Astrov in Timothy Koh's production of Uncle Vanya at the 440 Studios Black Box.

Filmography

Film

Television

References

External links
 
 

1997 births
Living people
Canadian male child actors
Canadian male film actors
Canadian male television actors
Canadian male voice actors
Male actors from Vancouver